opened in Sendai, Japan, in 1981. The collection has as its primary focus works associated with Miyagi Prefecture and the Tōhoku region more generally, from the Meiji period to the present day, and also includes paintings by Wassily Kandinsky and Paul Klee. Artists represented include Aimitsu, Kishida Ryūsei, Matsumoto Shunsuke, Nakamura Tsune, Takahashi Yuichi, Yasui Sōtarō, and Yorozu Tetsugoro.

The building was designed by Kunio Maekawa.

See also
 Sendai City Museum
 List of Cultural Properties of Japan - paintings (Miyagi)

References

External links
  The Miyagi Museum of Art
  Collection
  The Miyagi Museum of Art

Museums in Miyagi Prefecture
Art museums and galleries in Japan
Sendai
Art museums established in 1981
1981 establishments in Japan